Bejawada Gopal is an Indian film director who works in Telugu cinema. He has directed over 30 Telugu films, including successful films such as Bobbili Raja, Lorry Driver, Assembly Rowdy, State Rowdy, Rowdy Inspector, Samarasimha Reddy, Narasimha Naidu, Indra, Maska. He won Filmfare Award for Best Director – Telugu for the film Samarasimha Reddy. He also directed two Hindi films, Insaaf Ki Awaaz and Kanoon Apna Apna.

Childhood and early years
B. Gopal was born at M. Nidamanuru village near Tangutur, Prakasam district, Andhra Pradesh to B. Venkateswarulu and Mahalakshmi. He has two siblings, one brother Subba Rao and sister Suseela. He did his schooling in Karumanchi. Later he attended C.S.R.Sarma college in Ongole. After finishing his education, With his father permission he chose to pursue his career in movies. He is the uncle of Telugu film Actor Venu Thottempudi.

Career
He started his career working as an assistant director under P. C. Reddy. After working in two films under his guidance, he got an opportunity to work as an assistant director in Adavi Ramudu, under K. Raghavendra Rao. He considers K. Raghavendra Rao as his mentor and guru in the industry. He worked under him for almost 12 years, inAdavi Ramudu, Devatha, Justice Chowdary, Agni Parvatam etc. In 1982, while he was working as an associate director for Devatha, he was spotted by the producer of the film, Dr. Daggubati Ramanaidu. Impressed by his work and knowledge, Ramanaidu offered him the chance to direct a film under his banner. This led to B. Gopal's debut as a director with Prathidvani, starring Sharada, Arjun and Rajani. It released in 1986.

Afterwards, he went on to direct many commercially successful and cult films like Bobbili Raja, Lorry Driver, Assembly Rowdy, Rowdy Inspector, Samarasimha Reddy, Narasimha Naidu, Allari Ramudu, and Indra. His association with Paruchuri Brothers is well known in Telugu cinema. They have worked together on many successful films. He is also famously known for his collaboration with Nandamuri Balakrishna. He was the only director to have 3 industry hits, those being: Samarasimha Reddy, Narasimha Naidu, and Indra. This record was nearly untouched for, till the release of Baahubali 2: The Conclusion, in 2017. S.S.Rajamouli became the second director to have 3 industry hits, those being: Magadheera, Baahubali: The Beginning, and Baahubali 2: The Conclusion. Gopal's career hit a rough patch when his subsequent ventures after Allari Ramudu: Palnati Brahmanayudu, Adavi Ramudu, and Narasimhudu became major disasters at the box office. 

After a gap of four years, he directed Maska with Ram Pothineni, which released in 2009. It was commercially successful. In 2011, it was announced that he would again collaborate with Balakrishna in a project called Hara Hara Mahadev, but it was stalled after the launch. In 2012, he replaced director Boopathy Pandian for Aaradugula Bullet, starring Gopichand and Nayanthara. It was initially titled as Jagan Mohan IPS. However, due to financial problems, it was delayed till 2021, finally releasing on October 8, that year, to highly negative reviews.

Awards
 Filmfare Award for Best Director – Telugu – Samarasimha Reddy (1999).
 Nandi Award for Best First Film of a Director - Prathidvani (1986).

Filmography

 All films are in Telugu unless otherwise noted

References

External links
 

Living people
Telugu film directors
20th-century Indian film directors
People from Prakasam district
Filmfare Awards South winners
Hindi-language film directors
21st-century Indian film directors
Film directors from Andhra Pradesh
Year of birth missing (living people)